Henry Peter Kestel Dunn (11 September 1935) is a former Australian politician. He was a Liberal member of the South Australian Legislative Council from 1982 to 1997. From 1994 to 1997 he was President of the Council.

He is not closely related to the old Dunn family of South Australia which included the miller John Dunn who founded Mount Barker, John Dunn Jr. MHA, William Henry Dunn MHA, William Paltridge MHA, Herbert Charles Dunn MHA, agriculturist Charles Dunn (1796–1881) who founded Charleston, South Australia, the Rev. William Arthur Dunn, president of Prince Alfred College, architect Hedley Allen Dunn, and embezzler and arsonist Alfred Henry Dunn (c. 1845–1904).

References

 

1935 births
Living people
Liberal Party of Australia members of the Parliament of South Australia
Members of the South Australian Legislative Council
Presidents of the South Australian Legislative Council
Place of birth missing (living people)